Ann Van Sevenant (born 10 June 1959) is a Belgian philosopher.

Biography 
Van Sevenant was born in Torhout, Belgium. After her humanities, she studied Film and Photography at the Lucas School of Art in Brussels. Inspired by the teaching of Jan Wüst, she decided to study philosophy at the Vrije Universiteit Brussel (VUB), where she took the courses of Leopold Flam, Hubert Dethier and Annie Reniers.

After having obtained her master's degree in 1982, she lived in Rome, where she studied history of art and aesthetics at the University La Sapienza, and attended the courses of Mario Perniola and Emilio Garroni. While preparing her doctoral thesis, she took classes with Samuel IJsseling in Leuven and later in Paris the seminars of Jacques Derrida, who was an important source of inspiration. She obtained her PhD in 1987, with a thesis entitled "Benjamin Fondane's Aesthetics. Inquiry on the autonomy of art."

Ann Van Sevenant was professor of philosophy at the University of Antwerp from 1989 to 2004. She lectured (2007/2008) at the Philosophicum de Kabgayi (Ruanda) and was invited at different universities (Urbino, Palermo, Rome, Amsterdam, Leiden, Nijmegen, Utrecht, Paris, Albany, Haifa, Oxford).

She has published numerous articles in four languages and eighteen books on contemporary philosophy and aesthetics (see bibliography). Her work has been discussed in several international journals. She is an independent researcher and gives conferences at home and abroad.

Bibliography 
 Het verhaal van de filosofie. Handzame inleiding tot de wijsbegeerte van vroeger en nu, Antwerpen-Baarn, Hadewijch, 1992 (2nd ed. 1993, 3rd ed. 1996)
 Deconstructie. Een multidisciplinaire benadering, Leuven-Amersfoort, Acco, 1992
 La decostruzione e Derrida, Palermo, Aestetica, 1992
 Il filosofo dei poeti. L'estetica di Benjamin Fondane, Milano, Mimesis, 1994
 Poëtica van de architectuur, Antwerp-Baarn, Hadewijch, 1994
 Met water schrijven. De filosofie in het computertijdperk, Antwerp-Baarn, Hadewijch, 1997
 Importer en philosophie, Paris, Paris-Méditerranée, 1999 (Prize 2000 "Académie Royale de Langue et de Littérature Françaises de Belgique")
 Ecrire à la lumière. Le philosophe et l'ordinateur, Paris, Galilée, 1999
 Ademruimte. Van cultuurproduct tot productcultuur, Leende, Damon, 2000
 Philosophie de la sollicitude, Paris, Vrin, 2001
 Sexual Outercourse. Philosophy of Lovemaking, Leuven-Paris-Dudly, Peeters, 2005
 Wat zou de wereld zijn zonder filosofie?, with Samuel IJsseling, Kampen, Klement, 2007
 Levenswerk. Filosofie en aanvaarding, Antwerp, Garant, 2009
 Kleine filosofie van het vrijen, Antwerp, Garant, 2009
 Filosofie in honderd woorden, Antwerp, Garant, 2010
 Les Mondes de Jean Cocteau. Poétique et Esthétique/ Jean Cocteau's Worlds. Poetics and Aesthetics (livre + dvd), en collaboration avec David Gullentops, Paris, Non Lieu, 2012
 Ainsi pensait Zarathoustra. Une philosophie avant la lettre, Paris, Non Lieu, 2017
 Filosofie en fictie. Denkbeelden in dialoog, Utrecht, Klement, 2018
 Thus Replied Zarathustra, Mimesis International, 2020

References

External links 
 Ann Van Sevenant – centre-erasme, 
 Advisory Board Alternative Perspectives and Global Concerns Dr. Ann Van Sevenant – APGC
 cairn.info
 Ann Van Sevenant, Importer en philosophie

Belgian women writers
21st-century Belgian philosophers
1959 births
Living people